The following list of programs have been broadcast by Triple J.

Music

Speciality music shows 
Triple J programming schedule has included shows featuring many specialty genres including:   featuring new music - the show started in 1997 and changes its name to match the current year; The Racket features heavy metal - formerly Full Metal Racket and 3 Hours of Power; Hip Hop Show; Home & Hosed Triple J's Australian music show; Mix Up featuring DJ mixes; Radio Funktrust playing groove and funk - formerly The Groove Train; Roots N All with roots and blues; short.fast.loud featuring punk rock, hardcore punk, metalcore, and post-hardcore; The Club with dance; and The Sound Lab featuring experimental, IDM, post-rock, minimal techno, dubstep, ambient, and glitch.

J-Files 
The weekly J-Files show has had two incarnations over the years. From 1996 to 2003, it was a three-hour late weeknight show hosted by Richard Kingsmill. Each show was topical; it might feature an artist, a particular year in the past, or songs with a certain theme. Examples of themed shows include: #9 songs (which was the theme of 9 September 1999's show), cats & dogs, New Zealand bands, and banned songs.

From 2003 the J-Files was a one-hour Saturday afternoon show, hosted by various Triple J presenters, specifically focused on one particular artist. The final J-File was aired in November 2007. On Thursday 21 August 2014 the J Files made its debut on digital station Double J.

In 2018, Gemma Pike was announced as the second ever permanent host of The J Files.

Live at the Wireless 

Live at the Wireless is a long-standing tradition of Triple J. It is a weekly broadcast of live music, of a number of forms - open air festivals, smaller concerts, or acoustic performances in the studio. Occasionally, Triple J will host a live performance in a secret location, and give away tickets to a limited number of listeners, to allow them to be a part of the special event.

Home & Hosed 
Up until 2002, the Australian Music Show was Triple J's all-Australian music segment, broadcast as a three-hour late weeknight show (22:00 to 01:00) and hosted by Richard Kingsmill. Starting in 2003, the format changed to a two-hour show every weeknight (21:00 to 23:00, shortening Super Request and the late night speciality shows by an hour each) and Robbie Buck became the presenter. It proved to be one of Triple J's most popular changes, as the audience (and the station itself) has traditionally been very supportive of local talent and unsigned bands. The show has now been reduced to one hour, is only on Monday to Thursdays, and is hosted by Declan Byrne; who replaced Dom Allesio for 2018.

House Party 
On 2 February 2008, Triple J commenced broadcasting a house-party style programme mixed and presented by Nina Las Vegas. In July 2011, while Nina Las Vegas was on vacation, Ballarat mashup duo Yacht Club DJs hosted House Party for the entire month. The show was then hosted by Kristy Lee Peters. It is currently hosted By Ebony Boadu.

Like a Version 

Like a Version is a Friday weekly segment during the Breakfast show which involves music artists playing two songs; one original song and one cover song of the artists choice. The segment was originally created by Mel Bampton as part of the morning show Mel in the Morning. Due to ongoing popularity of the segment, the recordings are sold on compilation CDs.

News and current affairs

News 
Triple J has their own independent news team, specifically covering news and issues that are relevant to the youth of Australia, such as education and the environment, as well as general music news.

Current news staff: Nas Campanella, Alice Matthews, David Marchese and Ruby Cornish.

Past news journalists (some of whom are still with Triple J) include: Brooke Boney (now with Nine Network), Grace Jones, Simon Lauder (Now works for ABC Current Affairs Radio), Rhianna Patrick (now presenting Speaking Out on ABC Local Radio), Karen Barlow (Now works for Huffington Post), Bernadette Young (Now Drive presenter on ABC Gold Coast), Ronan Sharkey, Nikki Gemmell, Daniel Browning, Oscar McLaren, Michael Turtle, Sarah Gerathy, Meredith Griffiths (Now with ABC Current Affairs Radio, AM & PM), Emma Swift, George Roberts, Mark Di Stefano (now with Buzzfeed), Bill Birtles, Annette Samojlowicz, Stefanie Menezes, Ashleigh Raper, Lucy Carter, and Matthew Eaton (Now a Brisbane-based reporter & producer for ABC News Online).

The Hook Up 
From January 31, 2016 Hannah Reilly and special guests invite J listeners to share their thoughts on different topics regarding sex.

Hack 

Hack is Triple J's half-hour news and current affairs show. It is hosted by Dave Marchese. The Executive Producer is Kaitlyn Sawrey while Michael Atkin completes the Andrew Olle Scholarship. The current reporting team includes Irene Scott, Johnny Barrington, Patrick Abboud, Alex Mann & Claire Aird.

Talkback Classroom 

Triple J broadcast Talkback Classroom from 1998 to 2003, a program where secondary school students from around Australia interviewed various prominent politicians, business and community leaders on current affairs issues. The program now airs on ABC Radio National.

Heywire 
Where the youth in outback Australia can air their views through a youth forum. Entrants must be between 16 and 22, write and engaging story relating to the countryside and must work well on radio. There are 41 regions like Unearthed. The winner receives airplay of their story and one winner from each of the 41 regions, wins an all expenses paid trip to Canberra at the Australian Institute of Sport for the youth forum.

Comedy

The Breakfast Show 

The Breakfast Show is one of the station's flagship shows. In the late '80s it was hosted by Rusty Nails, and later by resident "dag", Maynard F# Crabbes. In the early 1990s it was co-hosted by Helen Razer and Mikey Robins, and later by Mikey Robins, Paul McDermott, and The Sandman (Steve Abbott). From 1999 until 2004, it was co-hosted by Adam Spencer and Wil Anderson. The pair were known for their unusual sense of humour, highlighted by regular segments including Mary from Junee, Essence of Steve, and Are You Smarter Than Dools?. The Breakfast Show also featured two radio serials presented by The Sandman: "Pleasant Avenue" and "204 Bell St".

Spencer and Anderson broadcast their final program for the station on Friday 26 November 2004 from Sydney University's Manning Bar, a site that held sentimental value to Spencer, as that was where he got his start in stand-up comedy. In 2005, Jay and Lindsay (aka 'The Doctor') from Frenzal Rhomb took over as hosts of Triple J's breakfast show. New segments include the radio skits Space Goat and Battalion 666, as well as the Under the Weather Sessions and The Friday Fuckwit. From 8 January 2007, former Lunch presenter Myf Warhurst joined Jay and Lindsay as a permanent member of the Breakfast Show team. Henry Stone (Comedian) contributed to the Triple J Debate Night series in 2013.

Following the departure of Jay (who left to travel), the 2008-2009 Breakfast Show line up was Robbie Buck, The Doctor, and Marieke Hardy. They regularly maintained contact with Jay during his overseas travel, calling him during a segment named Where in the World is Jason "Jay" Whalley, a pun on Where's Wally? and Where in the World Is Carmen Sandiego?.

In 2009, Robbie, Marieke, and The Doctor had a serial called "Claytron". Tuesdays offered "Nerds of a Feather" with Paul Verhoeven, whilst Friday offered "The Friday Fuckwit" as well as "Like a Version", a segment where famous recording artists perform a cover version of a song of their choice.

On 23 November 2009, it was announced that Tom Ballard and Alex Dyson (hosts of the 2009 Weekend Breakfast show) would take over as hosts of the 2010 Breakfast show. In December 2013, Tom Ballard resigned and was replaced by Matt Okine in January 2014.  "Like a Version" has continued with Okine and Dyson.

Okine and Dyson hosted the annual Matt & Alex Legend of the Year Awards from 2014–2016, presenting awards including Crumb of the Year to Richard Wilkins, and Legend of the Year to: Mark from Cromer, Tuesday rave advocate; Niamh from Hobart, live professor of love; and Dave 'Ruggsy' Rugs, former Hey Hey It's Saturday contestant.  In November 2016, it was announced that Okine and Dyson will leave Triple J to travel and pursue other opportunities. Their last show was broadcast on 16 December 2016.

In 2017 it was announced the Breakfast team would consist of former Adelaide community radio presenters and comedians Ben Harvey and Liam Stapleton, with current affairs from journalist Brooke Boney. Paralympian Dylan Alcott and comedian Gen Fricker were also regular guests. At the end of 2018, Boney and Alcott announced they would be leaving Triple J.

As of January 2019, the Breakfast team consists of former Adelaide community radio presenters and comedians Ben Harvey and Liam Stapleton, with current affairs from journalist Alice Matthews.

Weekend Breakfast 
Past presenters have included Jim Trail, Paul Verhoeven, Costa Zouliou, Gaby Brown, Scott Dooley, and Sam Simmons. Caroline Tran returned in 2010. The very popular Club Veg, featured Malcolm Lees and Vic Davies, from 1984 to 1986. They then moved to 2SM & Triple M. Weekend breakfast is now hosted by Stacy Gougoulis.

This Sporting Life 

This Sporting Life (TSL), which ran from 1986 to 2008, was a parody of sporting panel programs, created and hosted by actor-writer-comedians John Doyle and Greig Pickhaver (under the pseudonyms Roy Slaven & HG Nelson). As well as sport, the duo cast a wide comedic net that encompassed the worlds of entertainment, politics and celebrity. TSL was remarkable as one of the few successful comedy programs that was substantially improvised.

The longest-running show in Triple J's programming history, TSL commanded a large and dedicated nationwide audience. Special editions of TSL were broadcast to coincide with the NRL and AFL grand finals (The Festival of the Boot) as well as for all three of rugby league's State of Origin series matches. (see Roy and HG's State of Origin commentary). In 2009, after 22 years at the ABC, the duo left to work for the commercial rock station Triple M.

In 2012 Roy Slaven & HG Nelson's The Festival of the Boot returned to an ABC Radio station for the first time since 2009. To date all 3 AFL grand finals (labeled "Part 1") & all 3 NRL grand finals (labeled "Part 2") have been broadcast on ABC News Radio

Raw Comedy Competition 

Triple J supports, promotes and broadcasts clips from the Raw Comedy Competition, which is produced by the Melbourne International Comedy Festival. Podcasts of competition sets are available via the Triple J website.

Restoring the Balance 

Restoring the Balance was broadcast sporadically on Sunday afternoons during 2004. The primary concept behind the show was a satire of the contrasting political views between the conservative Australian Howard government, and the left-wing government-funded Triple J radio station. The show suggested that the station was forced to broadcast a segment of right-wing political views in order to restore the balance.

Ross and Terri 
Ross and Terri broadcast weekdays at lunch times, for two 2-week periods, over summer 2005 and 2006. It was hosted by Ross Noble and Terri Psiakis. It was initially a filler show, but the popularity of the pair was enough to bring them back in 2006.

Today Today 

Today Today was the name given to the drive show in 2004 and 2005, hosted by Chaser members Chris Taylor and Craig Reucassel. The show's name was derived from Today Tonight, a controversial Australian TV current affairs show screened on the Seven Network. Their humour was in a similar vein to CNNNN and The Chaser, being more politically driven. One of their more popular skits was "Coma FM", a parody of commercial radio stations.

Radio plays 
Triple J currently has had several comedic radio plays:

 Coma FM - satirical radio station performed by Today Today hosts Chris Taylor and Craig Reucassel.
 Space Goat - a parody radio sci fi performed by the breakfast show's Jay and the Doctor which borrowed many features of early radio science fictions such as a long intro for very little story which leaves many questions open, which the narrator spends some time pointing out at the end.
 Battalion 666 - a comedic radio drama which takes place on a fictional Royal Navy ship, HMS Beezlebub. It came about when, in 2004, the Royal Navy officially recognised LaVeyan Satanism as an official religion in which its personnel can partake. The show features Jay and the Doctor, John Safran, and various sound clips of famous people taken from recorded interviews such as Tom Cruise and Russell Crowe.

Saturday Night and Graveyard Shift 
In 2005 Dave Callan started at Triple J presenting the Saturday night/Sunday early morning program the Graveyard Shift.

In 2006 Dave hosted the Saturday evening timeslot, called Saturday Night. The show followed the pattern of Callan's mid-dawn shifts from previous years. In January 2007 this show was renamed Pirate Radio after one of the personae commonly adopted by callers. Listener interaction plays a significant role in Callan's programmes with regular callers such as "Steph from Tamworth", "Snake Charmer Farmer", and "Ukulele Guy", as well as an assortment of "randoms" and "carnies". On 27 January 2008, Dave returned to the Graveyard Shift (01:00-06:00 Sunday mornings). From January 2009 the show was shortened, finishing at 04:00. As of 2011 Dave is no longer on Triple J.

Sunday Night Safran 

Beginning in 2005, John Safran and Father Bob Maguire have co-hosted a Sunday night talk show interviewing international guests, generally discussing serious topics like religion and politics. The show is no longer on air.

The Race Race 

Beginning on 27 October 2008, Chris Taylor and Craig Reucassel co-hosted a comedy program centred on the 2008 US Presidential Election entitled The Race Race. The programme aired at 17:00 weekdays until the wrap-up episode, which aired on 5 November 2008, after the elections had concluded.

The program derived its name from the fact that Barack Obama, the first African–American to be nominated by a major American political party for president, was running a formerly exclusively white political race against the white Republican candidate, John McCain. The program became the number one podcast in Australia, and Triple J released a number of commemorative Race Race T-shirts which featured the show's catchphrase "I Like Pie".

Programming history

Weekends

References 

Triple J
Triple J
Australian culture-related lists